Ecologist of Greece is a Greek political party based in Athens that was founded in 1988. It is led by Konstantinos Papanikolas.

The party publishes the magazine Health and Ecology (Υγεία - Οικολογία) and runs the television station Telelight (Τηλεφώς). It also used to run a radio station in Athens called Health and Ecology Radio (Ράδιο Υγεία - Οικολογία) until 2001, when it was shut down.

In the 1989 European elections, it took 0,42% of the vote. Its share of the vote fell in subsequent elections. In the parliamentary elections of 2000 and 2004, and in the intervening local elections, Ecologists Greece formed an alliance with the Democratic Social Movement (DIKKI), the Agro Party (PAEKE) and others. The alliance won between 1 and 3 percent in these elections.

On 11 September 2009, Georgios Karatzaferis, leader of the far-right nationalist Popular Orthodox Rally (Laos) party announced that Ecologists Greece leader Papanikolas would run on the statewide Laos ticket in the 2009 Greek legislative election.

Electoral results

External links
Official Website
@Pathifinder

References

Political parties established in 1988
Green political parties in Greece
Green conservative parties